Shirvan is a city in Azerbaijan, located on the Kura River. It was called Zubovka until 1938 and Alibayramli until 2008. From 1938 to 1954, Shirvan possessed the status of a village. It obtained the status of a city of Republican level on January 4, 1963. The territory of the Shirvan is 72.7 km2, and the population is 87,400 according to the 2020 census. Population density is 1226 persons per 1 km2. The city also includes the settlement of Hajigarahmanly and Bairamly. 98.5% of the population are Azerbaijani, while others - Russians, Ukrainians, Tatars, Turks, and other natives.

History
Shirvan originally was the name of Caucasian Zone (From north of Kura river of modern Azerbaijan areas) from  809 A.D till nowadays. But the city Shirvan originated in the 19th century as the Russian resettlement village Zubovka, named in honor of Valerian Zubov, while it was known locally as Qarachukhar. Throughout history, Şirvan changed its name a few times.

In 1796, a special military squad led by General Zubov entered Azerbaijan. Yekaterina showed great interest in this march. 30 thousand troops were given to General Zubov's army. The rally began in St. Petersburg in the church, and the priests blessed the supreme commander and the Russian-Cossack forces.

General Zubov, who successfully progressed in Azerbaijan, named the village Yekaterinaserd. Two thousand Russian Kazaks were transferred here as the first event. They were equipped with military and agricultural tools. They would plant or harvest crops and caterpillars, and they would use the weapon as they wanted.

The city was called Zubovka prior to 1938, then was renamed Ali Bayramli in honor of Ali Bayramov from 1938 to 2008.

The city was renamed to 'Şirvan' by the decision of the Parliament of Azerbaijan on April 25, 2008. 'Shirvan' appears to be derived from Shīr ('Lion').

Throughout its history, Shirvan has suffered from floods because of its proximity to the river and the relatively low elevation of most of the town.

Economy 

Timurid mausoleum of Shirvan
The city is the oil center of the Shirvan region, which at one time gave a significant part of the liquid fuel produced onshore. Engineering enterprises, the light and food industry have been developed in the city. In addition, the railway junction passes through the city.

Oil and gas production and the fuel and energy complex as a whole have been and remain the basis of the city's economy. As before, today about 90% of the gross output in the city falls to this industry.

Archeological excavations 
The archaeological samples found in the vicinity of the town testify to the settlement of these lands in ancient times. On the territory on which Shirvan is located, once passed caravan routes. During archaeological excavations in 2 km from the city, in the lower part of Mishovdag, the remains of a 14th-century urban settlement were discovered. Found in the craft districts of this city, 12 pottery furnaces have been preserved in very good condition. Also here were found various objects of everyday life, and ornaments of folk crafts, carpet weaving, stone carvings and jewellery craft were preserved.

Geography

Shirvan is located on the left bank of the river Kura, on the Shirvan plain, on the transport junction. The largest in Europe Shirvan GRES is open in the city. The Shirvan Children's Music School has existed for more than 40 years. Situated in the east of the Kura lowland, on the left bank of the Kura, the young city of Shirvan was founded in 1954 in connection with the discovery of the Kurovdag oil field.

Climate
The summer months are typically dry and very hot due to Şirvan's semi-desert climate. The temperature can rise to 44 °C often resulting in moderate drought conditions. In contrast, winter is cool but not severe, rarely going below -6 °C.

Administrative divisions
The municipality of Shirvan consists of the city of Shirvan and the municipalities of Bayramly, Chilpagly and Haji Gahramanly. The mayor, presently Mardan Jamalov, embodies the executive power of the city.

Demographics
According to the State Statistics Committee, as of 2018, the population of city recorded 85,800 persons, which increased by 16,800 persons (about 24.3 percent) from 69,000 persons in 2000. 42,100 of total population are men, 43,700 are women. More than 27,3 percent of the population (about 23,500 persons) consists of young people and teenagers aged 14–29.

Population
Population 85,800 
Azerbaijanis 68.652 (99.7%) 
Meskhetian Turks 207 (0.3%)

Notable residents
The city's residents include: historian Farida Mammadova, footballer Samadagha Shikhlarov and dancer Oksana Rasulova.

See also
 Shirvan
 Şirvan, Turkey
 Shirvan, Iran
 Shirvan State Reserve
Administrative divisions of Azerbaijan

References

External links

Populated places in Azerbaijan
Cities and towns built in the Soviet Union
 
Districts of Azerbaijan